The 2021–22 season was the 126th season in existence of West Ham United Football Club and the club's tenth consecutive season in the top flight of English football. In addition to the domestic league, West Ham United participated in this season's editions of the FA Cup, EFL Cup and UEFA Europa League.

Squad

Season squad

Transfers

Transfers in

Loaned in

Loaned out

Transfers out

Pre-season friendlies
As part of their pre-season preparations, West Ham United confirmed they would play friendly matches against Dundee, Leyton Orient, Northampton Town, Reading, Celtic, Brentford and Atalanta.

Competitions

Overview

Premier League

League table

Results summary

Results by matchday

Matches
The league fixtures were revealed on 16 June 2021.

FA Cup

The Hammers were drawn at home to Leeds United in the third round and away to Kidderminster Harriers in the fourth round.

EFL Cup

Due to participation in UEFA competitions, the Hammers entered the competition in the third round and were drawn away to Manchester United and then Manchester City at home in the fourth round.

UEFA Europa League

Group stage

West Ham were drawn against Croatian side Dinamo Zagreb, Belgian side Genk and Austrian side Rapid Wien in the group stage, with the fixtures being released a day later.

Knockout phase

Round of 16

Quarter-finals

Semi-finals

Statistics
 Correct as of 22 May 2022

Appearances and goals

|-
! colspan=14 style=background:#dcdcdc; text-align:center| Goalkeepers

|-
! colspan=14 style=background:#dcdcdc; text-align:center| Defenders

|-
! colspan=14 style=background:#dcdcdc; text-align:center| Midfielders

|-
! colspan=14 style=background:#dcdcdc; text-align:center| Forwards

|}

Goalscorers
 Correct as of 22 May 2022

Clean sheets
The list is sorted by shirt number when total clean sheets are equal.

See also
 2021–22 in English football
 List of West Ham United F.C. seasons

References

West Ham United F.C. seasons
West Ham United
West Ham United
West Ham United
West Ham United